True Symphonic Rockestra is an opera-oriented project founded by Dirk Ulrich featuring Dream Theater vocalist James LaBrie accompanied by opera tenors Vladimir Grishko and Thomas Dewald.

The idea, dating back to 2000, was to get three world class singers to perform rock versions of the "best of" repertoire of the original Three Tenors combining the operatic elements with metal elements. Finally, in 2006, this idea became a reality, as the recording for their first album was completed in July.

Their first album, Concerto in True Minor, was released on March 28, 2008 on a new label, a cooperation between Brainrox Records (Germany) & Marinsound Records (Russia), with Sony BMG taking care of the distribution in Germany, Austria and Switzerland. It contains 21 songs.

Personnel

Vocals
James LaBrie - Rock Tenor
Volodymyr Hryshko - Opera Tenor
Thomas Dewald - Opera Tenor

Musicians
Dirk Ulrich - Guitar
Christopher Jesidero - Violin
Sandro Martinez - Guitar
Paul Mayland - drums
Marvin Philippi - Bass

External links
True Symphonic Rockestra

Musical groups established in 2006